Pierre Deblock (born 1 May 1973) is a French former professional footballer who played as a right midfielder.

Honours 
Lens

 Coupe Gambardella: 1992

Sedan

 Coupe de France runner-up: 1998–99

Auxerre

 Coupe de France: 2002–03
 UEFA Intertoto Cup runner-up: 2000

Notes

References

External links
 

1973 births
Living people
People from Auchel
Sportspeople from Pas-de-Calais
French footballers
Association football midfielders
RC Lens players
Amiens SC players
CS Sedan Ardennes players
AJ Auxerre players
SC Bastia players
Stade Lavallois players
La Vitréenne FC players
French Division 3 (1971–1993) players
Championnat National 2 players
Ligue 2 players
Championnat National players
Ligue 1 players
Championnat National 3 players
Footballers from Hauts-de-France